Ernst Soner (Nuremberg, December 1572 – Altdorf bei Nürnberg, 28 September 1612) was a German doctor and herbalist.

Life
Son of a businessman, he studied medicine at Altdorf University from 1589 to 1592 with Nicolaus Taurellus and Philipp Scherbe (1555–1605).

In 1598, a study trip to Leiden coincided with the missionary activity there of two Polish Socinian missionaries, Krzysztof Ostorodt (d. ca. 1611) and Andrzej Wojdowski. Soner was one of many students converted to Unitarianism. He then travelled through England, France and Italy, studying extensively in Padua, where it is assumed he studied with the "rationalist Aristotelian" Cesare Cremonini (1550–1631).

In Basel he graduated in medicine and in 1602 settled in Nuremberg to practice. In 1605 he succeed Philipp Scherbe and in 1607/1608 was made rector of the Altdorfer Akademie. He failed to save his colleague Nicolaus Taurellus from the plague.

Among his pupils were Johann Crell (from 1620 rector of the Racovian Academy), Michael Gittich, Martin Ruarus and Jonas Schlichting, influential proponents of Polish Unitarianism and the early Enlightenment.

Works 
 Theses de febribus. 1596.
 Theses de sanguinis missione in genere, pro Galeno. 1597.
 Disputatio inauguralis de melancholia. 1601. also in: Decas III disputationum medicarum selectarum. 1620.
 Theses medicae de sanguinis detractione per venas. 1606.
 De materia prima disputationes duae. 1607. also in J. P. Felwinger (ed.): Philosophia Altdorphina. 1644, Disp. IV und Disp. V.
 Commentarium in libros XII Metaphysicae Aristotelis, 1657

External links 
This article is mainly based on the German Wikipedia entry which itself is mainly based on:
 :de:s:ADB:Soner, Ernst, Allgemeine Deutsche Biographie

References 

17th-century German physicians
1572 births
1612 deaths
German Unitarians
16th-century German writers
16th-century German male writers
17th-century German writers
17th-century German male writers